Paul Teutul is the name of:
Paul Teutul Sr. (born 1949), American motorcycle designer and builder
Paul Teutul Jr. (born 1974), American reality television personality, son of Paul Teutul Sr.